Janžev Vrh is a dispersed settlement above Boračeva in the Municipality of Radenci in northeastern Slovenia.

References

External links 
Janžev Vrh on Geopedia

Populated places in the Municipality of Radenci